Georgi Spirov Naydenov (21 December 1931 – 28 May 1970) was Bulgarian football goalkeeper and manager. He is considered the greatest Bulgarian goalkeeper of all time.  Between 1955 and 1965 he played in 176 matches for CSKA Sofia. He was honoured as Bulgarian Footballer of the Year in 1961. Naydenov won the top Bulgarian league, the A PFG, 8 times (all with CSKA), as well as the Bulgarian Cup, 3 times (all with CSKA). He was respected for his incredible work ethic and his determination during training and matches alike.

International career
For the Bulgaria national football team Naydenov featured in 51 games and won a bronze medal at the 1956 Summer Olympics. He played for his country at the 1962 and 1966 World Cups. Even after he had retired from competing he still remained one of the fittest players in Bulgaria and this made his death all the more mysterious. He died in Damascus, Syria and initial reports claimed he had suffered a heart attack although members of his family and people close to him suspected he had been poisoned.

Honours

Player
 CSKA Sofia
 Bulgarian League: 8 times – 1955, 1956, 1957, 1958, 1959, 1960, 1961, 1962
 Bulgarian Cup: 3 times – 1955, 1961, 1965

References 

1931 births
1970 deaths
Bulgarian footballers
Bulgaria international footballers
Association football goalkeepers
Footballers from Sofia
1962 FIFA World Cup players
1966 FIFA World Cup players
PFC CSKA Sofia players
Footballers at the 1956 Summer Olympics
Footballers at the 1960 Summer Olympics
Olympic footballers of Bulgaria
Olympic bronze medalists for Bulgaria
Olympic medalists in football
First Professional Football League (Bulgaria) players
Medalists at the 1956 Summer Olympics